The cylindro-conoidal bullet is a type of muzzleloading firearm projectile with a convexly cone-like front end ("nose") and a cylindrical rear body, invented by Captain John Norton of the British 34th Regiment in 1832.  It had a cavitied base, so when fired, the thin concavity wall ("skirt") would expand outwards and seal up the bore diameter. The origin of his idea is an interesting one: when in southern British India, he examined the blow pipe darts used by the natives and found that their base was formed of elastic lotus pith, which by its expansion against the inner surface of the blow pipe prevented the leakage of air past it.

In 1836, Mr. W. Greener, a London-based gunsmith, improved on Norton's bullet design by inserting a conoidal wooden plug into its base. Although both inventions were rejected by the British Ordnance Department, the idea was taken up in France, and in 1849 Claude-Étienne Minié adopted Greener's design and produced the "Minié ball".

See also
Glossary of firearms terminology

Notes

References 
 

Ammunition